Kalinga-Apayao was a province of the Philippines in the Cordillera Administrative Region in the island of Luzon. It was formed, along with Benguet, Ifugao, and the new Mountain Province, from the earlier Mountain Province, with the passage of Republic Act No. 4695 in 1966. The said law was amended by RA No. 7878 in 1995, which divided the province into two new ones, Kalinga and Apayao.

As part of a cult of personality, long-time President Ferdinand Marcos made gradual changes to the borders of Kalinga-Apayao over the course of his rule with the aim of making the outline of the province, on a map, resemble the silhouette of his own head, facing towards his own native province of Ilocos Norte. The plan was unfinished when Marcos was overthrown in 1986.

History
Prior to the establishment of the province, the sub-provinces of Kalinga and Apayao, upon their establishment through Act No. 1642 in 1907, were used to be part of Lepanto-Bontoc (as Kalinga was taken from Cagayan and Isabela) and Cagayan provinces respectively. The sub-provinces were annexed into the Mountain Province which was established through Act No. 1876 in 1908.

In the early years, the sub-provinces underwent series of territorial changes:
 Part of Kalinga was transferred to another sub-province Bontoc (Executive Order 53, 1914); same as part of Apayao to the province of Ilocos Norte (EO 21, 1920).
 1922: In Apayao, a barrio of municipal district of Bayag (Calanasan) to Namaltugan.
 1926: In Kalinga, barrios in municipal district of Pinukpuk to Balbalan.
 1927: Parts of the municipal district of Pinukpuk in Kalinga to Conner in Apayao.

The sub-provinces became part of Kalinga-Apayao which was created along with three other new provinces comprising the old Mountain Province through Republic Act 4695 on June 18, 1966. Those provinces, with Abra, would become part of the Cordillera Administrative Region, created through EO 220 on July 15, 1987.

Since the creation of the sub-provinces, Tabuc (Tabuk) was designated as the capital of Kalinga. In Apayao, its first sub-provincial capital was Tauit until mid-1915, when it was moved to Kabugao via EO 45.

By December 1988, 52% of the barangays in the province were controlled by the New People's Army communist insurgent group while 43% are "under its influence" according to the House of Representatives Committee on National Defense. (Being divided later into two new provinces, both were separately declared insurgency-free in 2010: Apayao in February, Kalinga in November.)

Abolition and division
By virtue of RA 7878, signed on February 14, 1995, the sub-provinces in Kalinga-Apayao were converted into two new provinces, Kalinga and Apayao, with their capitals remain the same as before. Both comprises the same municipalities that were used to be part of these sub-provinces.

Majority of voters in Kalinga-Apayao ratified the said law in a plebiscite on May 8.

Administrative divisions

By the time Kalinga-Apayao was established, eight municipalities remained part of the subprovince of Kalinga, six municipalities in the Subprovince of Apayao as well.

Within almost three decades, two new municipalities were later created. On the same day of the creation of the province, Pasil in Kalinga was created (RA 4741); also, Santa Marcela in Apayao in 1967 (RA 4974). Meanwhile, the municipality of Quirino in Kalinga, which had established before, was abolished sometime between 1975 and 1980. Before the division in 1995, the province had 15 municipalities and 283 barangays.

Notes

References

Former provinces of the Philippines
1966 establishments in the Philippines
1995 disestablishments in the Philippines
History of Kalinga (province)
History of Apayao
States and territories established in 1966